JK Luunja was an Estonian football club, which originates from Luunja near the city of Tartu. Their home ground is located in nearby Kaagvere village in Mäksa Parish.

In January 2016, they joined with JK Tartu Tammeka and formed Tartu JK Tammeka U21.

References

External links
Info at Estonian Football Association

Football clubs in Estonia
Kastre Parish
2005 establishments in Estonia
2016 disestablishments in Estonia